Veselá may refer to:

Veselá (Pelhřimov District), village and municipality in the Czech Republic
Veselá (Rokycany District), village and municipality in the Czech Republic
Veselá (Semily District), village and municipality in the Czech Republic
Veselá (Zlín District), village and municipality in the Czech Republic

Feminine variant of surname Veselý

See also
Vesela (disambiguation)
Veselé (disambiguation)
Veselí (disambiguation)